Oleh Suk (born June 26, 1965 in Ternopil) is a Ukrainian rock musician, specializing in the bass guitar, (although he also plays the acoustic guitar and the synthesizer).

Early creative steps

He began his artistic path at the Lviv Polytechnic with sound and the bass guitar experiments. Permanent searches led him to the popular Lviv jazz band Melodrome. As a result, he received prizes at the Crystal Lion jazz festival twice in a row in the late 80's. The musician founded the art-rock Catharsis. After collaboration with Ludwik Konopko the two formed a new band Tea Fan Club (TFC). TFC had establishes itself as the premier art-rock band, drawing such notable musicians to join them such as singer Oleksandr Ksenofontov and guitarist Vlad DeBriansky. The band finished its existence in 1993, and to this day it is considered as the most influential musical project in Ukraine, rising to the status of legendary. Shortly after the TFC Oleg creates a project Ulysses, joins Glass Bead Game and later the Dead Rooster (1992), where he stays until now.

In 1995–1996 he organized the literary and musical jazz formation Lights of Big Cities with the writer Yuri Pokalchuk and the musician Yurko Duda.

In 2003 within its own project ... but time, as the river ... Oleh drew attention to the team with a specific philosophy –  Black September, found a common music language and affined music tastes, he began to work with it. The group received a second birth and a second name: Gorgisheli.

Personal projects

1995 – Project "IS". Trying to capture that period of the time in Lviv music (90's) Oleg enlisted about 50 artists. All music was written by John on the lyrics of the poets Bohdan Lepky, Bohdan-Ihor Antonych, Vasyl Pachovsky, Oleksandr Oles. In the audio album recording were involved the musicians and the bands who had been already well known at that time: Plach Yeremiyi and Taras Chubay, Mertvyi Piven, Tea Fan Club, 999, the guys from The Hadyukiny Brothers; debutants Okean Elzy, Lesya Herasymchuk and Royal rabbits, Pikkardiyska Tertsiya, Monuments of Architecture, and Ruslana.

2003 – ... but the time as a river .... The continuation of the "IS" project. Authors who were involved : Yuri Pokalchuk, Ihor Rymaruk, Kostya Moskalets. Some musical newcomers in 1995 (Okean Elzy, Pikkardiyska Tertsiya, Ruslana) are the real stars of the Ukrainian show-biz now. Other involved newcomers (Godo, Black September, Yurko Lavrin, Svitlana Kyrylchuk) brought new life to the old compositions and performed new songs.

Discography

References

Ukrainian bass guitarists
Ukrainian guitarists
Ukrainian jazz guitarists
Ukrainian rock guitarists
Ukrainian composers
Ukrainian musicians
Living people
1965 births
21st-century Ukrainian musicians
20th-century Ukrainian musicians